Victor Anthony Perera  is a Sri Lankan politician, a member of the Parliament of Sri Lanka. He belongs to the Sri Lanka Freedom Party.

References

1949 births
Living people
Members of the 14th Parliament of Sri Lanka
Sri Lanka Freedom Party politicians
United People's Freedom Alliance politicians
Sinhalese politicians